Munira (meaning luminous, bright, shining) is a female given name and may refer to:

 Munira A. Basrai, American geneticist
 Munira Fakhro, Bahraini academic
 Mounira El Mahdeya (born 1885), Egyptian singer
 Munira Khalil, American chemist 
 Munírih Khánum (1847 – 1938), prominent Bahá'í 
 Munira Mirza (born 1978), British political adviser
 Munira Mosli (1954–2019), Saudi Arabian plastic arts worker and painter
 Munira al-Qubaysi (born 1933), Syrian Sufi
 Monira Rahman (born 1966), Bangladeshi activist
 Munira Wilson (born 1978), British politician

See also
 Munir

Arabic feminine given names